Lydiate railway station was a station located on the Southport & Cheshire Lines Extension Railway off Carr Lane, just outside Lydiate. The Merseyside and Lancashire border runs down the stream alongside Altcar Lane, which runs parallel to the line.

The station first closed in 1917, along with all other stations on the extension line, as a World War I economy measure.

The station was reopened on 1 April 1919, and continued in use until 7 January 1952, when the SCLER was closed to passengers from Aintree Central to Southport Lord Street. The line remained open for public goods traffic until 7 July 1952 at Southport Lord St., Birkdale Palace and Altcar & Hillhouse Stations. Public goods facilities were ended at Woodvale, Lydiate and Sefton & Maghull stations on the same date as passenger services (7 January 1952) and there were never any goods facilities at Ainsdale Beach station to begin with. After 7 July 1952, a siding remained open at Altcar & Hillhouse for private goods facilities until May 1960. The last passenger train to run on the SCLER was a railway enthusiasts 'special' between Aintree and Altcar & Hillhouse railways stations on 6 June 1959.

Notes and references

Notes

Citations

Sources

External links
 The station and line via railwaycodes
 The station's history via Disused Stations UK
 The station on a 1948 O.S. map via npe Maps
 The station on an 1888-1913 Overlay OS Map via National Library of Scotland

Disused railway stations in the Borough of West Lancashire
Former Cheshire Lines Committee stations
Railway stations in Great Britain opened in 1884
Railway stations in Great Britain closed in 1917
Railway stations in Great Britain opened in 1919
Railway stations in Great Britain closed in 1952